French Gymnastics Championships are an annual gymnastics competition, organized by the French Gymnastics Federation. The men's and women's national championships in artistic gymnastics and the national championships in rhythmic gymnastics usually take place at the same time. The winners claim the title of "Champion of France".

Winners

See also 
 French Rhythmic Gymnastics Championships

References

External links 
 Les compétitions nationales on the FFGym official site

Gymnastics
Gymnastics competitions in France